The 61st United States Congress was a meeting of the legislative branch of the United States federal government, composed of the United States Senate and the United States House of Representatives. It met in Washington, D.C., from March 4, 1909, to March 4, 1911, during the first two years of William H. Taft's presidency. The apportionment of seats in the House of Representatives was based on the 1900 United States census. Both chambers had a Republican majority.

Major events

 March 4, 1909: William Howard Taft became President of the United States.

Major legislation

 August 5, 1909 – Payne–Aldrich Tariff Act, ch. 6, 
 May 16, 1910: Federal Mines Safety Act of 1910, Ch. 240, 
 June 18, 1910: Mann–Elkins Act, ch. 309, 
 June 25, 1910: Mann Act, ch. 395, 
 March 3, 1911: Judicial Code of 1911, ch. 231,

Constitutional amendments 
July 12, 1909: Approved an amendment to the United States Constitution allowing the Congress to levy an income tax without apportioning it among the states or basing it on the United States Census, and submitted it to the state legislatures for ratification
 Amendment was later ratified on February 3, 1913, becoming the Sixteenth Amendment to the United States Constitution

Party summary

Senate

House of Representatives

Leadership

Senate
 President: James S. Sherman (R)
 President pro tempore: William P. Frye (R)
 Republican Conference Chairman: Eugene Hale
 Republican Conference Secretary: Charles Curtis
 Democratic Caucus Chairman: Hernando Money
 Democratic Caucus Secretary: Robert Latham Owen

House of Representatives

 Speaker: Joseph Gurney Cannon (R)

Majority (Republican) leadership
 Majority Leader: Sereno E. Payne
 Majority Whip: John W. Dwight
 Republican Conference Chairman: Frank Dunklee Currier

Minority (Democratic) leadership
 Minority Leader: Champ Clark
 Minority Whip: vacant
 Democratic Caucus Chairman: Henry De Lamar Clayton Jr.
 Democratic Campaign Committee Chairman: James Tilghman Lloyd

Members
Skip to House of Representatives, below

Senate

At this time, most senators were elected by the state legislatures every two years, with one-third beginning new six-year terms with each Congress. A few senators were elected directly by the residents of the state. Preceding the names in the list below are Senate class numbers, which indicate the cycle of their election, In this Congress, Class 1 meant their term ended with this Congress, requiring reelection in 1910; Class 2 meant their term began in the last Congress, requiring reelection in 1912; and Class 3 meant their term began in this Congress, requiring reelection in 1914.

Alabama 
 2. John H. Bankhead (D)
 3. Joseph F. Johnston (D)

Arkansas 
 2. Jeff Davis (D)
 3. James P. Clarke (D)

California 
 1. Frank P. Flint (R)
 3. George C. Perkins (R)

Colorado 
 2. Simon Guggenheim (R)
 3. Charles J. Hughes Jr. (D), until January 11, 1911

Connecticut 
 1. Morgan G. Bulkeley (R)
 3. Frank B. Brandegee (R)

Delaware 
 1. Henry A. du Pont (R)
 2. Harry A. Richardson (R)

Florida 
 1. James P. Taliaferro (D)
 3. Duncan U. Fletcher (D)

Georgia 
 2. Augustus O. Bacon (D)
 3. Alexander S. Clay (D), until November 10, 1910
 Joseph M. Terrell (D), from November 17, 1910

Idaho 
 2. William E. Borah (R)
 3. Weldon B. Heyburn (R)

Illinois 
 2. Shelby Moore Cullom (R)
 3. William C. Lorimer (R), from June 18, 1909

Indiana 
 1. Albert J. Beveridge (R)
 3. Benjamin F. Shively (D)

Iowa 
 2. Jonathan P. Dolliver (R), until October 15, 1910 
 Lafayette Young (R), from November 12, 1910
 3. Albert B. Cummins (R)

Kansas 
 2. Charles Curtis (R)
 3. Joseph L. Bristow (R)

Kentucky 
 2. Thomas H. Paynter (D)
 3. William O. Bradley (R)

Louisiana 
 2. Murphy J. Foster (D)
 3. Samuel D. McEnery (D), until June 10, 1910
 John Thornton (D), from December 10, 1910

Maine 
 1. Eugene Hale (R)
 2. William P. Frye (R)

Maryland 
 1. Isidor Rayner (D)
 3. John W. Smith (D)

Massachusetts 
 1. Henry Cabot Lodge (R)
 2. Winthrop M. Crane (R)

Michigan 
 1. Julius C. Burrows (R)
 2. William A. Smith (R)

Minnesota 
 1. Moses E. Clapp (R)
 2. Knute Nelson (R)

Mississippi 
 1. Hernando D. Money (D)
 2. Anselm J. McLaurin (D), until December 22, 1909
 James Gordon (D), December 27, 1909 – February 22, 1910
 LeRoy Percy (D), from February 23, 1910

Missouri 
 1. William Warner (R)
 3. William J. Stone (D)

Montana 
 1. Thomas H. Carter (R)
 2. Joseph M. Dixon (R)

Nebraska 
 1. Elmer J. Burkett (R)
 2. Norris Brown (R)

Nevada 
 1. George S. Nixon (R)
 3. Francis G. Newlands (D)

New Hampshire 
 2. Henry E. Burnham (R)
 3. Jacob H. Gallinger (R)

New Jersey 
 1. John Kean (R)
 2. Frank O. Briggs (R)

New York 
 1. Chauncey Mitchell Depew (R)
 3. Elihu A. Root (R)

North Carolina 
 2. Furnifold M. Simmons (D)
 3. Lee S. Overman (D)

North Dakota 
 1. Porter J. McCumber (R)
 3. Martin N. Johnson (R), until October 21, 1909
 Fountain L. Thompson (D), November 10, 1909 – January 31, 1910
 William E. Purcell (D), February 1, 1910 – February 1, 1911
 Asle Gronna (R), from February 2, 1911

Ohio 
 1. Charles W. F. Dick (R)
 3. Theodore E. Burton (R)

Oklahoma 
 2. Robert L. Owen (D)
 3. Thomas P. Gore (D)

Oregon 
 2. Jonathan Bourne Jr. (R)
 3. George E. Chamberlain (D)

Pennsylvania 
 1.  Philander C. Knox (R), until March 4, 1909
 George T. Oliver (R), from March 17, 1909
 3. Boies Penrose (R)

Rhode Island 
 1. Nelson W. Aldrich (R)
 2. George P. Wetmore (R)

South Carolina 
 2. Benjamin R. Tillman (D)
 3. Ellison D. Smith (D)

South Dakota 
 2. Robert J. Gamble (R)
 3. Coe I. Crawford (R)

Tennessee 
 1. James B. Frazier (D)
 2. Robert L. Taylor (D)

Texas 
 1. Charles A. Culberson (D)
 2. Joseph W. Bailey (D)

Utah 
 1. George Sutherland (R)
 3. Reed Smoot (R)

Vermont 
 1. Carroll S. Page (R)
 3. William P. Dillingham (R)

Virginia 
 1. John W. Daniel (D), until June 29, 1910
 Claude A. Swanson (D), from August 1, 1910
 2. Thomas S. Martin (D)

Washington 
 1. Samuel H. Piles (R)
 3. Wesley L. Jones (R)

West Virginia 
 1. Nathan Bay Scott (R)
 2. Stephen B. Elkins (R), until January 4, 1911
 Davis Elkins (R), January 9, 1911 – January 31, 1911
 Clarence W. Watson (D), from February 1, 1911

Wisconsin 
 1. Robert M. La Follette Sr. (R)
 3. Isaac Stephenson (R)

Wyoming 
 1. Clarence D. Clark (R)
 2. Francis E. Warren (R)

House of Representatives

Alabama 
 . George W. Taylor (D)
 . S. Hubert Dent Jr. (D)
 . Henry D. Clayton (D)
 . William B. Craig (D)
 . J. Thomas Heflin (D)
 . Richmond P. Hobson (D)
 . John L. Burnett (D)
 . William N. Richardson (D)
 . Oscar Underwood (D)

Arkansas 
 . Robert B. Macon (D)
 . William A. Oldfield (D)
 . John C. Floyd (D)
 . William B. Cravens (D)
 . Charles C. Reid (D)
 . Joseph Taylor Robinson (D)
 . Robert M. Wallace (D)

California 
 . William F. Englebright (R)
 . Duncan E. McKinlay (R)
 . Joseph R. Knowland (R)
 . Julius Kahn (R)
 . Everis A. Hayes (R)
 . James C. Needham (R)
 . James McLachlan (R)
 . Sylvester C. Smith (R)

Colorado 
 . Atterson Walden Rucker (D)
 . John A. Martin (D)
 . Edward T. Taylor (D)

Connecticut 
 . E. Stevens Henry (R)
 . Nehemiah D. Sperry (R)
 . Edwin W. Higgins (R)
 . Ebenezer J. Hill (R)
 . John Q. Tilson (R)

Delaware 
 . William H. Heald (R)

Florida 
 . Stephen M. Sparkman (D)
 . Frank Clark (D)
 . Dannite H. Mays (D)

Georgia 
 . Charles G. Edwards (D)
 . James M. Griggs (D), until January 5, 1910
 Seaborn Roddenbery (D), from February 6, 1910
 . Dudley M. Hughes (D)
 . William C. Adamson (D)
 . Leonidas F. Livingston (D)
 . Charles L. Bartlett (D)
 . Gordon Lee (D)
 . William M. Howard (D)
 . Thomas Montgomery Bell (D)
 . Thomas W. Hardwick (D)
 . William G. Brantley (D)

Idaho 
 . Thomas Ray Hamer (R)

Illinois 
 . Martin B. Madden (R)
 . James R. Mann (R)
 . William W. Wilson (R)
 . James T. McDermott (D)
 . Adolph J. Sabath (D)
 . William Lorimer (R), until June 17, 1909
 William J. Moxley (R), from November 23, 1909
 . Frederick Lundin (R)
 . Thomas Gallagher (D)
 . Henry S. Boutell (R)
 . George E. Foss (R)
 . Howard M. Snapp (R)
 . Charles Eugene Fuller (R)
 . Frank O. Lowden (R)
 . James McKinney (R)
 . George W. Prince (R)
 . Joseph V. Graff (R)
 . John A. Sterling (R)
 . Joseph G. Cannon (R)
 . William B. McKinley (R)
 . Henry T. Rainey (D)
 . James M. Graham (D)
 . William A. Rodenberg (R)
 . Martin D. Foster (D)
 . Pleasant T. Chapman (R)
 . Napoleon B. Thistlewood (R)

Indiana 
 . John W. Boehne (D)
 . William A. Cullop (D)
 . William E. Cox (D)
 . Lincoln Dixon (D)
 . Ralph Wilbur Moss (D)
 . William O. Barnard (R)
 . Charles A. Korbly (D)
 . John A. M. Adair (D)
 . Martin A. Morrison (D)
 . Edgar D. Crumpacker (R)
 . George W. Rauch (D)
 . Cyrus Cline (D)
 . Henry A. Barnhart (D)

Iowa 
 . Charles A. Kennedy (R)
 . Albert F. Dawson (R)
 . Charles E. Pickett (R)
 . Gilbert N. Haugen (R)
 . James W. Good (R)
 . Nathan E. Kendall (R)
 . John A. T. Hull (R)
 . William Darius Jamieson (D)
 . Walter I. Smith (R)
 . Frank P. Woods (R)
 . Elbert H. Hubbard (R)

Kansas 
 . Daniel Read Anthony Jr. (R)
 . Charles Frederick Scott (R)
 . Philip P. Campbell (R)
 . James Monroe Miller (R)
 . William A. Calderhead (R)
 . William A. Reeder (R)
 . Edmond H. Madison (R)
 . Victor Murdock (R)

Kentucky 
 . Ollie M. James (D)
 . Augustus Stanley (D)
 . Robert Y. Thomas Jr. (D)
 . Ben Johnson (D)
 . J. Swagar Sherley (D)
 . Joseph L. Rhinock (D)
 . J. Campbell Cantrill (D)
 . Harvey Helm (D)
 . Joseph B. Bennett (R)
 . John W. Langley (R)
 . Don C. Edwards (R)

Louisiana 
 . Albert Estopinal (D)
 . Samuel Louis Gilmore (D), March 30, 1909 – July 18, 1910
 Henry Garland Dupré (D), from November 8, 1910
 . Robert F. Broussard (D)
 . John Thomas Watkins (D)
 . Joseph E. Ransdell (D)
 . Robert Charles Wickliffe (D)
 . Arsène Paulin Pujó (D)

Maine 
 . Amos L. Allen (R), until February 20, 1911
 . John P. Swasey (R)
 . Edwin C. Burleigh (R)
 . Frank E. Guernsey (R)

Maryland 
 . J. Harry Covington (D)
 . J. Frederick C. Talbott (D)
 . John Kronmiller (R)
 . John Gill Jr. (D)
 . Sydney E. Mudd (R)
 . George A. Pearre (R)

Massachusetts 
 . George P. Lawrence (R)
 . Frederick H. Gillett (R)
 . Charles G. Washburn (R)
 . Charles Q. Tirrell (R), until July 31, 1910
 John Joseph Mitchell (D), from November 8, 1910
 . Butler Ames (R)
 . Augustus P. Gardner (R)
 . Ernest W. Roberts (R)
 . Samuel W. McCall (R)
 . John A. Keliher (D)
 . Joseph F. O'Connell (D)
 . Andrew J. Peters (D)
 . John W. Weeks (R)
 . William S. Greene (R)
 . William C. Lovering (R), until February 4, 1910
 Eugene Foss (D), March 22, 1910 – January 4, 1911

Michigan 
 . Edwin C. Denby (R)
 . Charles E. Townsend (R)
 . Washington Gardner (R)
 . Edward L. Hamilton (R)
 . Gerrit J. Diekema (R)
 . Samuel W. Smith (R)
 . Henry McMorran (R)
 . Joseph W. Fordney (R)
 . James C. McLaughlin (R)
 . George A. Loud (R)
 . Francis H. Dodds (R)
 . H. Olin Young (R)

Minnesota 
 . James Albertus Tawney (R)
 . Winfield Scott Hammond (D)
 . Charles Russell Davis (R)
 . Frederick C. Stevens (R)
 . Frank Nye (R)
 . Charles August Lindbergh (R)
 . Andrew Volstead (R)
 . Clarence B. Miller (R)
 . Halvor Steenerson (R)

Mississippi 
 . Ezekiel S. Candler Jr. (D)
 . Thomas Spight (D)
 . Benjamin G. Humphreys II (D)
 . Thomas U. Sisson (D)
 . Adam M. Byrd (D)
 . Eaton J. Bowers (D)
 . William A. Dickson (D)
 . James W. Collier (D)

Missouri 
 . James T. Lloyd (D)
 . William W. Rucker (D)
 . Joshua Willis Alexander (D)
 . Charles F. Booher (D)
 . William Patterson Borland (D)
 . David A. De Armond (D), until November 23, 1909
 Clement C. Dickinson (D), from February 1, 1910
 . Courtney W. Hamlin (D)
 . Dorsey W. Shackleford (D)
 . James Beauchamp Clark (D)
 . Richard Bartholdt (R)
 . Patrick F. Gill (D)
 . Harry M. Coudrey (R)
 . Politte Elvins (R)
 . Charles A. Crow (R)
 . Charles H. Morgan (R)
 . Arthur P. Murphy (R)

Montana 
 . Charles N. Pray (R)

Nebraska 
 . John A. Maguire (D)
 . Gilbert M. Hitchcock (D)
 . James P. Latta (D)
 . Edmund H. Hinshaw (R)
 . George W. Norris (R)
 . Moses P. Kinkaid (R)

Nevada 
 . George A. Bartlett (D)

New Hampshire 
 . Cyrus A. Sulloway (R)
 . Frank Dunklee Currier (R)

New Jersey 
 . Henry C. Loudenslager (R)
 . John J. Gardner (R)
 . Benjamin F. Howell (R)
 . Ira W. Wood (R)
 . Charles N. Fowler (R)
 . William Hughes (D)
 . Richard Wayne Parker (R)
 . William H. Wiley (R)
 . Eugene F. Kinkead (D)
 . James A. Hamill (D)

New York 
 . William W. Cocks (R)
 . George H. Lindsay (D)
 . Otto G. Foelker (R)
 . Charles B. Law (R)
 . Richard Young (R)
 . William M. Calder (R)
 . John J. Fitzgerald (D)
 . Daniel J. Riordan (D)
 . Henry M. Goldfogle (D)
 . William Sulzer (D)
 . Charles V. Fornes (D)
 . Michael F. Conry (D)
 . Herbert Parsons (R)
 . William Willett Jr. (D)
 . J. Van Vechten Olcott (R)
 . Francis B. Harrison (D)
 . William S. Bennet (R)
 . Joseph A. Goulden (D)
 . John E. Andrus (R)
 . Thomas W. Bradley (R)
 . Hamilton Fish II (R)
 . William H. Draper (R)
 . George N. Southwick (R)
 . George W. Fairchild (R)
 . Cyrus Durey (R)
 . George R. Malby (R)
 . Charles S. Millington (R)
 . Charles L. Knapp (R)
 . Michael E. Driscoll (R)
 . John W. Dwight (R)
 . Sereno E. Payne (R)
 . James B. Perkins (R), until March 11, 1910
 James Smith Havens (D), from April 19, 1910
 . J. Sloat Fassett (R)
 . James S. Simmons (R)
 . Daniel A. Driscoll (D)
 . De Alva S. Alexander (R)
 . Edward B. Vreeland (R)

North Carolina 
 . John Humphrey Small (D)
 . Claude Kitchin (D)
 . Charles R. Thomas (D)
 . Edward W. Pou (D)
 . John M. Morehead (R)
 . Hannibal L. Godwin (D)
 . Robert N. Page (D)
 . Charles H. Cowles (R)
 . Edwin Y. Webb (D)
 . John G. Grant (R)

North Dakota 
 . Louis B. Hanna (R)
 . Asle Gronna (R), until February 11, 1911

Ohio 
 . Nicholas Longworth (R)
 . Herman P. Goebel (R)
 . James M. Cox (D)
 . William E. Tou Velle (D)
 . Timothy T. Ansberry (D)
 . Matthew R. Denver (D)
 . J. Warren Keifer (R)
 . Ralph D. Cole (R)
 . Isaac R. Sherwood (D)
 . Adna R. Johnson (R)
 . Albert Douglas (R)
 . Edward L. Taylor Jr.  (R)
 . Carl C. Anderson (D)
 . William G. Sharp (D)
 . James Joyce (R)
 . David Hollingsworth (R)
 . William A. Ashbrook (D)
 . James Kennedy (R)
 . W. Aubrey Thomas (R)
 . L. Paul Howland (R)
 . James H. Cassidy (R), from April 20, 1909

Oklahoma 
 . Bird Segle McGuire (R)
 . Dick Thompson Morgan (R)
 . Charles E. Creager (R)
 . Charles D. Carter (D)
 . Scott Ferris (D)

Oregon 
 . Willis C. Hawley (R)
 . William R. Ellis (R)

Pennsylvania 
 . Henry H. Bingham (R)
 . Joel Cook (R), until December 15, 1910
 . J. Hampton Moore (R)
 . Reuben O. Moon (R)
 . William W. Foulkrod (R), until November 13, 1910
 . George D. McCreary (R)
 . Thomas S. Butler (R)
 . Irving P. Wanger (R)
 . William W. Griest (R)
 . Thomas D. Nicholls (ID)
 . Henry W. Palmer (R)
 . Alfred B. Garner (R)
 . John H. Rothermel (D)
 . Charles C. Pratt (R)
 . William B. Wilson (D)
 . John G. McHenry (D)
 . Benjamin K. Focht (R)
 . Marlin E. Olmsted (R)
 . John M. Reynolds (R), until January 17, 1911
 . Daniel F. Lafean (R)
 . Charles F. Barclay (R)
 . George F. Huff (R)
 . Allen F. Cooper (R)
 . John K. Tener (R), until January 16, 1911
 . Arthur L. Bates (R)
 . A. Mitchell Palmer (D)
 . J. N. Langham (R)
 . Nelson P. Wheeler (R)
 . William H. Graham (R)
 . John Dalzell (R)
 . James F. Burke (R)
 . Andrew J. Barchfeld (R)

Rhode Island 
 . William P. Sheffield Jr. (R)
 . Adin B. Capron (R)

South Carolina 
 . George S. Legare (D)
 . James O. Patterson (D)
 . Wyatt Aiken (D)
 . Joseph T. Johnson (D)
 . David E. Finley (D)
 . J. Edwin Ellerbe (D)
 . Asbury F. Lever (D)

South Dakota 
 . Charles H. Burke (R)
 . Eben Martin (R)

Tennessee 
 . Walter P. Brownlow (R), until July 8, 1910
 Zachary D. Massey (R), from November 8, 1910
 . Richard W. Austin (R)
 . John Austin Moon (D)
 . Cordell Hull (D)
 . William C. Houston (D)
 . Joseph W. Byrns (D)
 . Lemuel Phillips Padgett (D)
 . Thetus Willrette Sims (D)
 . Finis J. Garrett (D)
 . George W. Gordon (D)

Texas 
 . John Morris Sheppard (D)
 . Martin Dies (D)
 . Gordon J. Russell (D), until June 14, 1910
 Robert M. Lively (D), from July 23, 1910
 . Choice Boswell Randell (D)
 . James Andrew Beall (D)
 . Rufus Hardy (D)
 . Alexander W. Gregg (D)
 . John M. Moore (D)
 . George Farmer Burgess (D)
 . Albert Sidney Burleson (D)
 . Robert L. Henry (D)
 . Oscar W. Gillespie (D)
 . John Hall Stephens (D)
 . James L. Slayden (D)
 . John Nance Garner (D)
 . William R. Smith (D)

Utah 
 . Joseph Howell (R)

Vermont 
 . David J. Foster (R)
 . Frank Plumley (R)

Virginia 
 . William Atkinson Jones (D)
 . Harry Lee Maynard (D)
 . John Fletcher Lamb (D)
 . Francis R. Lassiter (D), until October 31, 1909
 Robert Turnbull (D), from March 8, 1910
 . Edward W. Saunders (D)
 . Carter Glass (D)
 . James Hay (D)
 . Charles Creighton Carlin (D)
 . C. Bascom Slemp (R)
 . Henry De Flood (D)

Washington 
 . William E. Humphrey (R)
 . Francis W. Cushman (R), until July 6, 1909
 William W. McCredie (R), from November 2, 1909
 . Miles Poindexter (R)

West Virginia 
 . William P. Hubbard (R)
 . George Cookman Sturgiss (R)
 . Joseph Holt Gaines (R)
 . Harry C. Woodyard (R)
 . James Anthony Hughes (R)

Wisconsin 
 . Henry Allen Cooper (R)
 . John M. Nelson (R)
 . Arthur W. Kopp (R)
 . William J. Cary (R)
 . William H. Stafford (R)
 . Charles H. Weisse (D)
 . John Jacob Esch (R)
 . James Henry Davidson (R)
 . Gustav Küstermann (R)
 . Elmer A. Morse (R)
 . Irvine L. Lenroot (R)

Wyoming 
 . Franklin Wheeler Mondell (R)

Non-voting members 
 . James Wickersham (R)
 . Ralph Henry Cameron (R)
 . Jonah Kunio Kalanianaole (R)
 . William Henry Andrews (R)
 . Benito Legarda (Fed., R)
 . Pablo Ocampo, until November 22, 1909 (D)
 Manuel Quezon, (Unionist), from November 23, 1909
 . Tulio Larrínaga (Resident Commissioner), (Unionist)

Changes in membership

The count below reflects changes from the beginning of the first session of this Congress.

Senate
 Replacements: 13
 Democratic: 1 seat net gain
 Republican: 1 seat net loss
 Deaths: 8
 Resignations: 2
 Vacancy: 1
 Total seats with changes:  14

House of Representatives
 Replacements: 12
 Democratic: 3 seat gain
 Republican: 3 seat loss
 Deaths: 12
 Resignations: 6
 Contested elections: 0
 Total seats with changes: 21

Committees

Senate

 Additional Accommodations for the Library of Congress (Select) (Chairman: Charles A. Culberson; Ranking Member: Shelby M. Cullom)
 Agriculture and Forestry (Chairman: Jonathan P. Dolliver; Ranking Member: Hernando D. Money)
 Appropriations (Chairman: Eugene Hale; Ranking Member: Benjamin R. Tillman)
 Audit and Control the Contingent Expenses of the Senate (Chairman: John Kean; Ranking Member: Hernando D. Money)
 Canadian Relations (Chairman: William A. Smith; Ranking Member: Benjamin R. Tillman)
 Census (Chairman: Robert M. La Follette; Ranking Member: Samuel D. McEnery)
 Civil Service and Retrenchment (Chairman: Albert B. Cummins; Ranking Member: N/A)
 Claims (Chairman: Henry E. Burnham; Ranking Member: Thomas S. Martin)
 Coast and Insular Survey (Chairman: Samuel H. Piles; Ranking Member: Alexander S. Clay)
 Coast Defenses (Chairman: George S. Nixon; Ranking Member: James P. Taliaferro)
 Commerce (Chairman: William P. Frye; Ranking Member: Thomas S. Martin)
 Conservation of National Resources (Chairman: Joseph M. Dixon; Ranking Member: Francis G. Newlands)
 Corporations Organized in the District of Columbia (Chairman: James P. Taliaferro; Ranking Member: Norris Brown)
 Cuban Relations (Chairman: George Sutherland; Ranking Member: Jacob H. Gallinger)
 Disposition of Useless Papers in the Executive Departments (Chairman: Furnifold M. Simmons; Ranking Member: Jacob H. Gallinger)
 Distributing Public Revenue Among the States (Select)
 District of Columbia (Chairman: Jacob H. Gallinger; Ranking Member: Norris Brown)
 Education and Labor (Chairman: William E. Borah; Ranking Member: John W. Daniel)
 Engrossed Bills (Chairman: Augustus O. Bacon; Ranking Member: Henry Cabot Lodge)
 Enrolled Bills (Chairman: Robert J. Gamble; Ranking Member: Murphy James Foster Jr.)
 Establish a University in the United States (Select) (Chairman: Simon Guggenheim)
 Examination of Disposition of Documents (Select)
 Examine the Several Branches in the Civil Service (Chairman: Isaac Stephenson; Ranking Member: Charles A. Culberson)
 Expenditures in the Department of Agriculture (Chairman: Harry A. Richardson; Ranking Member: Furnifold M. Simmons)
 Expenditures in the Interior Department (Chairman: Coe I. Crawford; Ranking Member: Jeff Davis)
 Expenditures in the Department of Justice (Select) (Chairman: William O. Bradley; Ranking Member: Joseph W. Bailey)
 Expenditures in the Navy Department (Select) (Chairman: William Lorimer; Ranking Member: Thomas S. Martin)
 Expenditures in the Post Office Department (Chairman: Joseph L. Bristow; Ranking Member: Augustus O. Bacon)
 Expenditures in the Department of State (Select) (Chairman: Elihu Root; Ranking Member: N/A)
 Expenditures in the Treasury Department (Select) (Chairman: Theodore E. Burton; Ranking Member: James P. Clarke)
 Expenditures in the War Department (Select) (Chairman: Henry A. du Pont; Ranking Member: Hernando D. Money)
 Finance (Chairman: Nelson W. Aldrich; Ranking Member: John W. Daniel)
 Fisheries (Chairman: Jonathan Bourne Jr.; Ranking Member: Samuel D. McEnery)
 Five Civilized Tribes of Indians (Select) (Chairman: Benjamin R. Tillman; Ranking Member: Moses E. Clapp)
 Foreign Relations (Chairman: Shelby M. Cullom; Ranking Member: Augustus O. Bacon) 
 Forest Reservations and the Protection of Game (Chairman: Frank B. Brandegee; Ranking Member: Benjamin R. Tillman)
 Geological Survey (Chairman: Frank O. Briggs; Ranking Member: Hernando D. Money)
 Immigration (Chairman: William P. Dillingham; Ranking Member: N/A)
 Indian Affairs (Chairman: Moses E. Clapp; Ranking Member: William J. Stone)
 Indian Depredations (Chairman: Charles Curtis; Ranking Member: Thomas S. Martin)
 Indian Contracts Investigation (Select) 
 Industrial Expositions (Chairman: Wesley L. Jones; Ranking Member: John W. Daniel)
 Interoceanic Canals (Chairman: Frank P. Flint; Ranking Member: James P. Taliaferro)
 Interstate Commerce (Chairman: Stephen B. Elkins; Ranking Member: Benjamin R. Tillman)
 Irrigation and Reclamation of Arid Lands (Chairman: Thomas H. Carter; Ranking Member: Joseph W. Bailey)
 Judiciary (Chairman: Clarence D. Clark; Ranking Member: Augustus O. Bacon) 
 Library (Chairman: George P. Wetmore; Ranking Member: John W. Daniel)
 Manufactures (Chairman: Weldon B. Heyburn; Ranking Member: Alexander S. Clay)
 Military Affairs (Chairman: Francis E. Warren; Ranking Member: James P. Taliaferro)
 Mines and Mining (Chairman: Charles Dick; Ranking Member: Benjamin R. Tillman)
 Mississippi River and its Tributaries (Select) (Chairman: William Warner; Ranking Member: Samuel D. McEnery)
 National Banks (Chairman: N/A; Ranking Member: N/A)
 Naval Affairs (Chairman: George C. Perkins; Ranking Member: Benjamin R. Tillman)
 Pacific Islands and Puerto Rico (Chairman: Chauncey M. Depew; Ranking Member: James P. Clarke)
 Pacific Railroads (Chairman: Elmer J. Burkett; Ranking Member: James P. Taliaferro)
 Patents (Chairman: Norris Brown; Ranking Member: Murphy J. Foster Jr.)
 Pensions (Chairman: Porter J. McCumber; Ranking Member: James P. Taliaferro)
 Philippines (Chairman: Henry Cabot Lodge; Ranking Member: Joseph F. Johnston)
 Post Office and Post Roads (Chairman: Boies Penrose; Ranking Member: Alexander S. Clay)
 Potomac River Front (Select)
 Printing (Chairman: Reed Smoot; Ranking Member: John W. Smith)
 Private Land Claims (Chairman: John W. Daniel; Ranking Member: Julius Kahn)
 Privileges and Elections (Chairman: Julius C. Burrows; Ranking Member: John Kean)
 Public Buildings and Grounds (Chairman: Nathan B. Scott; Ranking Member: Charles A. Culberson)
 Public Expenditures (Chairman: Eugene Hale; Ranking Member: N/A)
 Public Health and National Quarantine (Chairman: Thomas S. Martin; Ranking Member: Chauncey M. Depew)
 Public Lands (Chairman: Knute Nelson; Ranking Member: Samuel D. McEnery)
 Railroads (Chairman: Morgan G. Bulkeley; Ranking Member: Augustus O. Bacon)
 Revision of the Laws (Chairman: Weldon B. Heyburn; Ranking Member: N/A)
 Revolutionary Claims (Chairman: Joseph W. Bailey; Ranking Member: William O. Bradley)
 Rules (Chairman: Winthrop Murray Crane; Ranking Member: Augustus O. Bacon)
 Standards, Weights and Measures (Select) (Chairman: Carroll S. Page; Ranking Member: Augustus O. Bacon)
 Tariff Regulation (Select)
 Territories (Chairman: Albert J. Beveridge; Ranking Member: James P. Clarke)
 Third Degree Ordeal
 Transportation and Sale of Meat Products (Select) (Chairman: Samuel D. McEnery; Ranking Member: John W. Daniel)
 Transportation Routes to the Seaboard (Chairman: George T. Oliver; Ranking Member: John W. Daniel)
 Trespassers upon Indian Lands (Select) (Chairman: N/A; Ranking Member: N/A)
 Wages and Prices of Commodities (Select)
 Whole
 Woman Suffrage (Chairman: Alexander S. Clay; Ranking Member: Albert J. Beveridge)

House of Representatives

 Accounts (Chairman: James A. Hughes; Ranking Member: Charles L. Bartlett)
 Agriculture (Chairman: Charles Frederick Scott; Ranking Member: John Lamb)
 Alcoholic Liquor Traffic (Chairman: Nehemiah D. Sperry; Ranking Member: Ezekiel S. Candler Jr.)
 Appropriations (Chairman: James A. Tawney; Ranking Member: Leonidas F. Livingston)
 Banking and Currency (Chairman: Edward B. Vreeland; Ranking Member: Arsene Pujo)
 Census (Chairman: Edgar D. Crumpacker; Ranking Member: James Hay)
 Claims (Chairman: George W. Prince; Ranking Member: Henry M. Goldfogle)
 Coinage, Weights and Measures (Chairman: William B. McKinley; Ranking Member: Thomas W. Hardwick)
 Disposition of Executive Papers (Chairman: Arthur L. Bates; Ranking Member: Joshua Frederick Cockey Talbott)
 District of Columbia (Chairman: Samuel W. Smith; Ranking Member: Dorsey W. Shackleford)
 Education (Chairman: James F. Burke; Ranking Member: Asbury F. Lever)
 Election of the President, Vice President and Representatives in Congress (Chairman: Joseph H. Gaines; Ranking Member: William W. Rucker)
 Elections No.#1 (Chairman: Charles L. Knapp; Ranking Member: Ollie M. James)
 Elections No.#2 (Chairman: James M. Miller; Ranking Member: William E. Tou Velle)
 Elections No.#3 (Chairman: Michael E. Driscoll; Ranking Member: Charles C. Carlin)
 Enrolled Bills (Chairman: William W. Wilson; Ranking Member: Henry Thomas Rainey)
 Expenditures in the Agriculture Department (Chairman: William H. Graham; Ranking Member: Henry D. Flood)
 Expenditures in the Commerce and Labor Departments (Chairman: David J. Foster; Ranking Member: Arsene P. Pujo)
 Expenditures in the Interior Department (Chairman: Bird S. McGuire; Ranking Member: Robert N. Page)
 Expenditures in the Justice Department (Chairman: Sydney E. Mudd; Ranking Member: Henry M. Goldfogle)
 Expenditures in the Navy Department (Chairman: Henry S. Boutell; Ranking Member: Lemuel P. Padgett)
 Expenditures in the Post Office Department (Chairman: Irving P. Wanger; Ranking Member: Carter Glass)
 Expenditures in the State Department (Chairman: Don C. Edwards; Ranking Member: Courtney W. Hamlin)
 Expenditures in the Treasury Department (Chairman: Ebenezer J. Hill; Ranking Member: John Lamb)
 Expenditures in the War Department (Chairman: George P. Lawrence; Ranking Member: Joseph L. Rhinock)
 Expenditures on Public Buildings (Chairman: E. Stevens Henry; Ranking Member: John H. Small)
 Foreign Affairs (Chairman: James B. Perkins; Ranking Member: William M. Howard)
 Immigration and Naturalization (Chairman: Benjamin F. Howell; Ranking Member: John L. Burnett)
 Indian Affairs (Chairman: Charles H. Burke; Ranking Member: John H. Stephens)
 Industrial Arts and Expositions (Chairman: William A. Rodenberg; Ranking Member: Harry L. Maynard)
 Insular Affairs (Chairman: Marlin E. Olmsted; Ranking Member: William A. Jones)
 Interstate and Foreign Commerce (Chairman: James R. Mann; Ranking Member: William C. Adamson)
 Invalid Pensions (Chairman: Cyrus A. Sulloway; Ranking Member: George H. Lindsay)
 Irrigation of Arid Lands (Chairman: William A. Reeder; Ranking Member: William R. Smith)
 Judiciary (Chairman: Richard W. Parker; Ranking Member: Henry De Lamar Clayton) 
 Labor (Chairman: John J. Gardner; Ranking Member: Henry Thomas Rainey) 
 Levees and Improvements of the Mississippi River (Chairman: Philip P. Campbell; Ranking Member: Robert B. Macon)
 Library (Chairman: Samuel W. McCall; Ranking Member: William M. Howard)
 Manufactures (Chairman: Henry McMorran; Ranking Member: Joseph T. Johnson)
 Merchant Marine and Fisheries (Chairman: William S. Greene; Ranking Member: Thomas Spight)
 Mileage (Chairman: Charles A. Kennedy; Ranking Member: Matthew R. Denver)
 Military Affairs (Chairman: John A.T. Hull; Ranking Member: William Sulzer)
 Militia (Chairman: Halvor Steenerson; Ranking Member: John Gill Jr.)
 Mines and Mining (Chairman: George F. Huff; Ranking Member: George A. Bartlett)
 Naval Affairs (Chairman: George E. Foss; Ranking Member: Lemuel P. Padgett)
 Pacific Railroads (Chairman: Thomas S. Butler; Ranking Member: James L. Slayden)
 Patents (Chairman: Frank D. Currier; Ranking Member: William Sulzer)
 Pensions (Chairman: Henry C. Loudenslager; Ranking Member: William Richardson)
 Post Office and Post Roads (Chairman: John W. Weeks; Ranking Member: John A. Moon)
 Printing (Chairman: Allen F. Cooper; Ranking Member: David E. Finley)
 Private Land Claims (Chairman: Ernest W. Roberts; Ranking Member: William A. Jones)
 Public Buildings and Grounds (Chairman: Richard Bartholdt; Ranking Member: William G. Brantley)
 Public Lands (Chairman: Frank W. Mondell; Ranking Member: Adam M. Byrd)
 Railways and Canals (Chairman: James H. Davidson; Ranking Member: William Hughes)
 Reform in the Civil Service (Chairman: Frederick H. Gillett; Ranking Member: William O. Barnard)
 Revision of Laws (Chairman: Reuben O. Moon; Ranking Member: John T. Watkins)
 Rivers and Harbors (Chairman: De Alva S. Alexander; Ranking Member: Stephen M. Sparkman)
 Rules (Chairman: John Dalzell; Ranking Member: Champ Clark) 
 Standards of Official Conduct
 Territories (Chairman: Edward L. Hamilton; Ranking Member: James T. Lloyd)
 Ventilation and Acoustics (Chairman: George D. McCreary; Ranking Member: George W. Rauch)
 War Claims (Chairman: Charles B. Law; Ranking Member: Thetus W. Sims)
 Ways and Means (Chairman: Sereno E. Payne; Ranking Member: Champ Clark)
 Whole

Joint committees

 Conditions of Indian Tribes (Special)
 Disposition of (Useless) Executive Papers
 Investigate the Interior Department and Forestry Service
 The Library
 Printing

Caucuses
 Democratic (House)
 Democratic (Senate)

Employees

Legislative branch agency directors
 Architect of the Capitol: Elliott Woods
 Librarian of Congress: Herbert Putnam 
 Public Printer of the United States: Samuel B. Donnelly

Senate
 Chaplain: Edward E. Hale (Unitarian) until June 10, 1909
 Ulysses G.B. Pierce (Unitarian) elected June 18, 1909
 Librarian: Edward C. Goodwin
 Secretary: Charles G. Bennett
 Sergeant at Arms: Daniel M. Ransdell

House of Representatives
 Chaplain: Henry N. Couden (Universalist)
 Clerk: Alexander McDowell
 Doorkeeper: Frank B. Lyon
 Clerk at the Speaker's Table: Asher C. Hinds
 Postmaster: Samuel Langum
 Reading Clerks: E.L. Sampson (D) and Dennis E. Alward (R)
 Sergeant at Arms: Henry Casson

See also 
 1908 United States elections (elections leading to this Congress)
 1908 United States presidential election
 1908–09 United States Senate elections
 1908 United States House of Representatives elections
 1910 United States elections (elections during this Congress, leading to the next Congress)
 1910–11 United States Senate elections
 1910 United States House of Representatives elections

References